Leaf Hua Li is founder, chairman, and chief executive officer of Futu Holdings Ltd. Li is also on the board of Futu Securities (Hong Kong) Co. Ltd., Futu Network Technology Ltd., Futu Securities International (Hong Kong) Ltd. and Futu, Inc.

Li joined Tencent in 2000 and was an early and key research and development participant in Tencent QQ and the founder of Tencent Video.

References

Year of birth missing (living people)
Living people
Chinese company founders